This is a list of the 100 best-selling singles in France during the 1990s (i.e. release in France from 1 January 1990 to 31 December 1999).

Top 100 of the 1990s

Singles

See also
List of number-one hits (France)

References

French record charts
Lists of best-selling singles
1990s record charts
1990s in French music